Korhalli is a large village located in Almel Taluk in Bijapur District of Karnataka State, India.

Geography
It comes under Korhalli Panchayath. It belongs to Belgaum Division. Karnataka with total 494 families residing. The Korhalli village has population of 2803 of which 1470 are males while 1333 are females as per Population Census 2011.

Demographics
 India census, Korhalli had a population of 2,803 with 1,470 Males and 1,333 Females. In Korhalli village population of children with age 0-6 is 391 which makes up 13.95% of total population of village. Average Sex Ratio of Korhalli village is 907 which is lower than Karnataka state average of 973. Child Sex Ratio for the Korhalli as per census is 917, lower than Karnataka average of 948. Korhalli village has lower literacy rate compared to Karnataka. In 2011, literacy rate of Korhalli village was 62.35% compared to 75.36% of Karnataka. In Korhalli Male literacy stands at 73.38% while female literacy rate was 50.17%.

As per constitution of India and Panchyati Raaj Act, Korhalli village is administrated by Sarpanch (Head of Village) who is elected representative of village.

See also
Bijapur
Districts of Karnataka
Sindagi
Bengaluru
Muddebihal
Almel

References

External links

Villages in Bijapur district, Karnataka